Absolutely Normal Chaos is a children's or young-adult novel by Sharon Creech, published in the U.K. by Macmillan Children's Books in 1990. It was the American author's first book for children, completed at the midpoint of nearly two decades living in England and Switzerland. Although set in her hometown Euclid, Ohio, it was not published in her native country until 1995 (HarperCollins), after she won the annual Newbery Medal recognizing Walk Two Moons as the preceding year's best American children's book.

Absolutely Normal Chaos is  a 13-year-old girl's "complete and unabridged journal for English class" and can be classed as a bildungsroman.

Synopsis
Mary Lou Finney is more than excited about her assignment to keep a journal over the summer. Not only does she have to keep a journal, but she must read the Odyssey. The Odyssey is continuously referenced within her own writing. She adds her own comments about the Odyssey that reference to her own life. As the novel unfolds, Mary Lou's cousin, Carl Ray stays with her family. Carl Ray does this in order to look for a job. As the novel progresses, Mary Lou learns about Carl Ray's difficulties in life and how he has struggled. After discovering this information, Mary Lou finds it easier to examine her struggles with her family, her friends, and herself.

Sharon Creech stated that the inspiration for this story was an occasion when, "I'd been living overseas (England and Switzerland) for about ten years, and I was sadly missing my family back in the States. I thought I'd write a story about normal family chaos and that's how this began, with me trying to remember what it was like growing up in my family. Writing the story was a way for me to feel as if my family were with me, right there in our little cottage in England.".

Reviews

(Children's Literature)
Mary Lou's efforts to make sense of Homer's Odyssey add depth and delight to the story, ... She sees parallels in her own experiences that adds to the comic elements in this original coming of age story. The results are in turn funny, wise, serious, and irreverent. This story is a winner for middle schoolers who may even be motivated to read Homer's classic poem.

Cindy Darling Codell, Clark Middle School, Winchester, KY (School Library Journal)
Creech's dialogue is right on target. Her characterization is nicely done also. By comparison, this book is differently voiced than Walk Two Moons (HarperCollins, 1994), lacks that book's masterful imagery, and is more superficial in theme; but appropriately so. Creech has remained true to Mary Lou, who is a different narrator, and one who will win many fans of her own. Those in search of a light, humorous read will find it; those in search of something a little deeper will also be rewarded.

(Kirkus Reviews - reviewed on September 1, 1995)
Creech's first children's novel, published in England but never before in the US, will quickly make its way into the hands of readers who loved Walk Two Moons (1994). ... Her voice rings 100 percent true, and although she has her serious moments, Mary Lou is a stitch. Much of the humor derives from Creech's playful use of language: When Mary Lou's mother forbids her using the words God, stupid, and stuff, Mary Lou makes a foray into the thesaurus with hilarious results. The plot takes unlikely turns, but Creech gets away with it because the characters are so believable. Tightly written, nary a word out of place, by turns sarcastic, tender, and irreverent, this a real piece of comedy about contemporary teen life from one funny writer. (Fiction. 10-14)

See also

References

External links
  —immediately, first US edition 

American young adult novels
Novels by Sharon Creech
1990 American novels
Novels set in Ohio
Euclid, Ohio
Macmillan Publishers books
1990 debut novels
British young adult novels
Bildungsromans